John Reid (1757-11 April 1821), known to his family and friends as Jack, was a Scottish merchant in Canton in the late eighteenth century, where he was in partnership with John Henry Cox and Daniel Beale. 
Reid was born in Tain in Ross-shire, Scotland in 1757, the second son of John Reid (1725 – 1779) a Bailie of Tain, and his wife Mary Ross (1725 – 1808).

Early career 
By 1779 he was in Canton acting as the Austrian Emperor's Consul and was in partnership with a man named Bourgoyne of the French Hong.   He was also the agent for Willem Bolts's Trieste Company. In January 1781 John Henry Cox, son of the well known London clockmaker James Cox who had become bankrupt in Canton in 1774, arrived in Macau to try to retrieve some of his father's bad debts and to sell off his remaining stock. He and Jack Reid went into partnership under the name Cox and Reid.  The firm acted as agents for India-based shippers who were bringing in raw cotton, cotton piece goods and opium. The partners bought two small ships of their own (the ‘Supply’ and the ‘Enterprise) to trade on their own account. In 1783 the firm was joined by Daniel Beale.

Partnership with Cox and Beale 

In 1785: “Sensing a good thing, the firm of Cox and Reid bought a small brig of 60 tons, (called the ‘Harmon’ but renamed the ‘Sea Otter’) under the command of Captain James Hanna, and despatched the little vessel with a small cargo of woollens, blankets, iron bars, knives, nails, etc. and a supply of ornaments and baubles to the north-west coast of America, to barter with the ‘Red Indians’ in Canada for furs. The area was supposed to be a preserve of the South Sea Company, of London, but this did not seem to worry Cox and his friends in the least. Five hundred and sixty sea-otter skins were obtained and landed and sold at Canton for over £5,000”.  (or 20,600 Spanish dollars)
In 1786, trading under the fictitious name of the 'Austrian East India Company’ (a name supposedly pinched from the earlier legitimate company which had gone bankrupt in 1785), the partners bought in London a 400-ton ship called the Loudoun, fitted her out there and renamed her ‘Imperial Eagle’. With false papers (to avoid paying license fees to the East India Company) and flying the Austrian flag she sailed on 24 November from Ostend under Captain Charles William Barkley for Nootka Sound, Vancouver Island via Cape Horn. After various adventures she returned to China towards the end of 1787 with 800 furs which were sold in Macao for 30,000 Spanish silver dollars.

By this time however Jack Reid had gone bankrupt. “Not content with the truly splendid profits made by the firm of which he was a partner, he had been engaging in some speculations on his own account in Canton, probably selling on extended terms to Chinese merchants goods obtained on credit from his constituents in India or lending money borrowed in India to Chinese merchants in Canton for the sake of the higher rate of interest promised by the Chinese. He overestimated the probity of his Chinese clients and when these debtors absconded he sustained such heavy losses that he had to declare himself insolvent. The Imperial Austrian Company closed its doors and John Reid left China, a victim of his own gullibility and covetousness.”

Later life 
Reid left Canton in February 1787 on the East India Company ship Ganges.   (782 tons)
The firm of Cox and Beale, with the later addition of Jack Reid's younger brother David (1761 -1845) who left Canton in 1801, eventually became Jardine Matheson.
On Jack Reid's return to London he joined his older brother Andrew (1751 – 1841) as a distiller and wine and spirit merchant. When Andrew Reid invested in and became a partner in Meux's Brewery in 1793, Jack also became a partner.
In 1795 Jack married Ann Holland (1768 – 1848), the daughter of a clergyman. Meux's Brewery became Meux Reid, and after an acrimonious split with the Meux family in 1808, in 1816 became Reid's Brewery.  
Jack lived at 48 Bedford Square, London, next door to his brother Andrew at no 46, and also owned Kingswood Lodge in Egham, Surrey. At his death on 11/4/1821 he was still the owner of 5 £10,000 shares in Reid's Brewery.

References 

Scottish merchants
History of alcoholic drinks